Alonso de Idiáquez y Yurramendi (1497-1547), known in Basque as Alfontso Idiakez, was a Spanish nobleman and politician.  He was born in Tolosa, Gipuzkoa.

His son Juan de Idiáquez y Olazábal also entered the service of the king.

Career
Idiáquez began his career working for Francisco de los Cobos, and became royal secretary to Charles I of Spain. 

He was a knight of the orders of Alcántara, Calatrava and Santiago.

Patronage of the arts 
Idiáquez was the dedicatee of a book on letter-writing, De conscribendis epistolis published in the 1530s.  He met the author, Juan Luis Vives, in the Habsburg Netherlands. Vives begins by telling “Señor Idiáquez” to always consider the rhetorical situation for the letter, primarily evaluating the relationship of the writer to the recipient.

He may have commissioned the illuminated manuscript known as the  Munich-Montserrat Book of Hours, which was the work of the Flemish miniaturist Simon Bening. The manuscript is known to have been in the possession of a Dominican friary in San Sebastian associated with Idiaquez.

Death and burial

He met a violent death in Torgau, Germany, at the hands of Protestants. His body was taken back to Spain for burial.

References

1497 births
1547 deaths
Secretaries